John Glenn High School can mean:

 Elwood-John H. Glenn High School, Huntington, New York
 John Glenn High School (California), Norwalk, California
 John Glenn High School (New Concord, Ohio)
 John Glenn High School (Bangor Township, Michigan)
 John Glenn High School (Westland, Michigan)
 John Glenn High School (Walkerton, Indiana)

See also
 John Glenn Middle School of International Studies, a middle school in Indio, California
 Glenn High School (disambiguation)
 John Glenn (disambiguation)